The following is a list of diesel and electric locomotives produced by Electroputere Craiova, Romania.

For Romanian Railways

Diesel locomotives
The diesel electric locomotives employed by CFR and built by Electroputere Craiova are known as classes 60 to 68 and originally registered under the series 060-DA. They were based on a design created by SLM Winterthur, BBC Baden and Sulzer Winterthur and bears, externally, resemblance to AE 6/6 Swiss electric locomotives. New diesel modernised (post-1999) locomotives are painted in blue livery, while older ones have grey livery.

Electric locomotives
The electric locomotives employed by Romanian Railways-CFR and built by Electroputere Craiova are known as EA-type and were originally based on the license of the Swedish company ASEA. All are built for standard gauge (1435 mm) and run using a catenary wire at 50 Hz 25 kV AC. Older electric locomotives are painted in grey livery, while modernised (post-1999) rolling stock use red livery.

For British Rail

The 3500 HP Diesel electric locomotive, known as LDE 3500 HP-BR, was manufactured for British Railways. A total of 30 locomotives have been delivered.

For Bulgarian Railways

The 2100 HP Diesel electric locomotive, similar to Romanian Class 62, known as BDŽ LDE 2100HP Class 06, was manufactured for Bulgarian Railways. A total of 130 locomotives of this type have been delivered.

The BDŽ Class 46 Electric Locomotive of 5100 kW for Bulgarian Railways, and similar to Romanian Class 40, was manufactured as a more improved alternative against EL 5100 kW for Romanian Railways. A total of 45 locomotives of this type have been delivered.

For China Railways

The 2100 HP Diesel electric locomotive, similar to Romanian Class 62, known as LDE 2100HP ND2, was manufactured for China Railway. A total of 285 locomotives have been delivered.

With a different body, another model of diesel electric locomotives, known as LDE 2100 HP-ND3, was employed by China Railway. A total of 88 locomotives of this type have been delivered.

The Electric Locomotive of 5100 kW was also manufactured for China Railways. They were known as RS1, and only 2 locomotives have been delivered.

For Hellenic Railways

The diesel electric locomotives employed by Hellenic Railways are known as LDE 4000 HP-OSE. A total of 10 locomotives have been delivered.

For Iranian Railways
The diesel electric locomotives employed by Iranian Railways are known as LDE 2640 HP-IR. A total of 20 locomotives have been delivered.

For Polish State Railways

The 2100 HP Diesel electric locomotive, similar to Romanian Class 62, known as LDE 2100HP PKP, was manufactured for Polish State Railways. A total of 422 locomotives have been delivered.

For Yugoslav Railways
The Electric Locomotive of 5100 kW was also manufactured for Yugoslav Railways. Known as Class 461, nowadays they are in use for Serbian Railways and Railways of Montenegro. A total of 103 locomotives have been delivered.

See also
 List of stock used by Romanian Railways

References

External links

Romanian locomotives photo gallery

Electroputere locomotives
Electroputere locomotives
Locomotives of Romania